John Kinney Mashburn has since October 2018 been an adviser of the Secretary of the Department of Veterans Affairs, Robert Wilkie. Previously he had been for six months senior adviser to Secretary of Energy Rick Perry.

Between January 20, 2017 and mid-April 2018, he was the White House Deputy Cabinet Secretary and Special Assistant to U.S. President Donald Trump on a salary of $130,000 per annum. 

He had been a policy director for the Trump Campaign and also a congressional aide to U.S. Senator Jesse Helms.

References 

 

Living people
Trump administration personnel
Year of birth missing (living people)